Yuan Shikai (16 September 1859 – 6 June 1916) was a Chinese military and government official who rose to power during the late Qing dynasty and eventually ended the Qing dynasty rule of China in 1912, later becoming the Emperor of China. He first tried to save the dynasty with a number of modernization projects including bureaucratic, fiscal, judicial, educational, and other reforms, despite playing a key part in the failure of the Hundred Days' Reform. He established the first modern army and a more efficient provincial government in North China during the last years of the Qing dynasty before forcing the abdication of the Xuantong Emperor, the last monarch of the Qing dynasty in 1912. Through negotiation, he became the first President of the Republic of China in 1912. This army and bureaucratic control were the foundation of his autocratic rule. In 1915 he attempted to restore the hereditary monarchy in China, with himself as the Hongxian Emperor. His death in 1916 shortly after his abdication led to the fragmentation of the Chinese political system and the end of the Beiyang government as China's central authority.

Early life 
On 16 September 1859, Yuan Shikai was born in the village of Zhangying to the Yuan Clan which later moved 16 kilometers southeast of Xiangcheng to a hilly area that was easier to defend against bandits. There the Yuans had built a fortified village, Yuanzhaicun.

Yuan's family was affluent enough to provide Yuan with a traditional Confucian education. As a young man he enjoyed riding, dogging, boxing, and entertainment with friends. Though hoping to pursue a career in the civil service, he failed the Imperial examinations twice, leading him to decide on an entry into politics through the Huai Army, where many of his relatives served. His career began with the purchase of a minor official title in 1880, which was a common method of official promotion in the late Qing. Using his father's connections, Yuan travelled to Tengzhou, Shandong, and sought a post in the Qing Brigade. Yuan's first marriage was in 1876 to a woman of the Yu family who bore him a first son, Keding, in 1878. Yuan Shikai married nine more concubines throughout the course of his life.

Years in Joseon Korea 
In the early 1870s, Korea under the Joseon dynasty was in the midst of a struggle between isolationists under King Gojong's father Heungseon Daewongun, and progressives, led by Empress Myeongseong, who wanted to open trade. After the Meiji Restoration, Japan had adopted an aggressive foreign policy, contesting Chinese domination of the peninsula. Under the Treaty of Ganghwa, which the Koreans signed with reluctance in 1876, Japan was allowed to send diplomatic missions to Hanseong, and opened trading posts in Incheon and Wonsan. Amidst an internal power struggle which resulted in the queen's exile, the Viceroy of Zhili, Li Hongzhang, sent the 3,000 strong Qing Brigade into Korea. The Korean king proposed training 500 troops in the art of modern warfare, and Yuan Shikai was appointed to lead this task in Korea. Li Hongzhang also recommended Yuan's promotion, with Yuan given the rank of sub-prefect.

Following the suppression of Gapsin Coup. In 1885, Yuan was appointed Imperial Resident of Seoul. On the surface the position equalled that of ambassador but in practice, as head official from the suzerain, Yuan had become the supreme adviser on all Korean government policies. Perceiving China's increasing influence on the Korean government, Japan sought more influence through co-suzerainty with China. A series of documents were released to Yuan Shikai, claiming the Korean government had changed its stance towards Chinese protection and would rather turn to Russia for protection. Yuan was outraged yet skeptical and asked Li Hongzhang for advice.

In a treaty signed between Japan and Qing, the two parties agreed only to send troops into Korea after notifying the other. Although the Korean government was stable, it was still a protectorate of Qing. Koreans emerged advocating modernization. Another more radicalised group, the Donghak Society, promoting an early nationalist doctrine based partly upon Confucian principles, rose in rebellion against the government. Yuan and Li Hongzhang sent troops into Korea to protect Seoul and Qing's interests, and Japan did the same under the pretext of protecting Japanese trading posts. Tensions boiled over between Japan and China when Japan refused to withdraw its forces and placed a blockade at the 38th Parallel. Li Hongzhang wanted at all costs to avoid a war with Japan and attempted this by asking for international pressure for a Japanese withdrawal. Japan refused, and war broke out. Yuan, having been put in an ineffective position, was recalled to Tianjin in July 1894, before the official outbreak of the First Sino-Japanese War.

Yuan Shikai had three Korean concubines, one of whom was Korean Princess Li's relative, concubine Kim. 15 of Yuan's children came from these three Korean women.

Late Qing dynasty

Yuan's rise to fame began with his nominal participation in the First Sino-Japanese War as commander of the Chinese garrison forces in Korea. Unlike other officers, however, he avoided the humiliation of Chinese defeat by having been recalled to Peking several days before the outbreak of conflict.

As an ally of Li Hongzhang, Yuan was appointed the commander of the first New Army in 1895. Yuan's training program modernized the army, creating enormous pride, and earning him the loyalty of capable senior officers. By 1901, five of China's seven divisional commanders and most other senior military officers in China were his protégés. The Qing court relied heavily on his army due to the proximity of its garrison to the capital and their effectiveness. Of the new armies that formed part of the Self-Strengthening Movement, Yuan's was the best trained and most effective.  His success opened the way for his rise to the top in both military and political sectors.

The Qing Court at the time was divided between progressives under the leadership of the Guangxu Emperor, and conservatives under the Empress Dowager Cixi, who had temporarily retreated to the Summer Palace as a place of "retirement". After the Guangxu Emperor's Hundred Days' Reform in 1898, however, Cixi decided that the reforms were too drastic, and plotted to restore her own regency through a coup d'état. Plans of the coup spread early, and the Emperor was very aware of the plot. He asked reform advocates Kang Youwei, Tan Sitong and others to develop a plan to save him. Yuan's involvement in the coup remains a matter of debate among historians. Tan Sitong reportedly spoke with Yuan several days before the coup, asking Yuan to assist the Emperor against Cixi. Yuan refused a direct answer, but insisted he was loyal to the Emperor. Meanwhile, Manchu General Ronglu was planning manoeuvres for his army to stage the coup.

According to sources, including the diary of Liang Qichao and contemporary Chinese news sources, Yuan Shikai arrived in Tianjin on 20 September 1898 by train. It was certain that by the evening, Yuan had talked to Ronglu, but what was revealed to him remains ambiguous. Most historians suggest that Yuan had told Ronglu of all details of the Reformers' plans, and asked him to take immediate action. The plot being exposed, Ronglu's troops entered the Forbidden City at dawn on 21 September, forcing the Emperor into seclusion in a lake palace.

Making a political alliance with the Empress Dowager, and becoming a lasting enemy of the Guangxu Emperor, Yuan left the capital in 1899 for his new appointment as Governor of Shandong. During his three-year tenure the Boxer Rebellion (1899–1901) erupted; Yuan ensured the suppression of Boxers in the province, though his troops took no active part outside Shandong itself. Yuan took the side of the pro-foreign faction in the Imperial Court, along with Prince Qing, Li Hongzhang, and Ronglu. He refused to side with the Boxers and attack the Eight-Nation Alliance forces, joining with other Chinese governors who commanded substantial modernized armies like Zhang Zhidong not participating in the Boxer Rebellion. He and Zhang ignored Empress Dowager Cixi's declaration of war against the foreign powers and continued to suppress the Boxers. This clique was known as The Mutual Protection of Southeast China. In addition to not fighting the Eight-Nation Alliance and suppressing the Boxers in Shandong, Yuan and his army (the Right Division) also helped the Eight-Nation Alliance suppress the Boxers after the Alliance captured Peking in August 1900. Yuan Shikai's forces massacred tens of thousands of people in their anti-Boxer campaign in Zhili. Yuan operated out of Baoding during the campaign, which ended in 1902.

He also founded a provincial junior college (Shandong College, the forerunner of Shandong University) in Jinan, which adopted western ideas of education.

In June 1902 he was promoted to Viceroy of Zhili, the lucrative commissioner for North China Trade, and Minister of Beiyang, comprising the modern regions of Liaoning, Hebei, and Shandong. Having gained the regard of foreigners after helping crush the Boxer Rebellion, he successfully obtained numerous loans to expand his Beiyang Army into the most powerful army in China. He created a 2,000-strong police force to keep order in Tianjin, the first of its kind in Chinese history, as a result of the Boxer Protocol forbidding any troops to be staged close to Tianjin. Yuan was also involved in the transfer of railway control from Sheng Xuanhuai, leading railways and their construction to become a large source of his revenue. Yuan played an active role in late-Qing political reforms, including the creation of the Ministry of Education and Ministry of Police. He further advocated ethnic equality between Manchus and Han Chinese.

In 1905, acting on Yuan's advice, Dowager-Empress Cixi issued a decree ending the traditional Confucian examination system that was formalized in 1906. She ordered the Ministry of Education to implement a system of primary and secondary schools and universities with state-mandated curriculum, modeled after the educational system of Meiji-period Japan. On 27 August 1908, the Qing court promulgated "Principles for a Constitution", which Yuan helped to draft. This document called for a constitutional government with a strong monarchy (modeled after Meiji Japan and Bismarck's Germany), with a constitution to be issued by 1916 and an elected parliament by 1917.

Yuan Shikai's Han-dominated New Army was primarily responsible for the defense of Beijing, as most of the modernized Eight Banner divisions were destroyed in the Boxer Rebellion and the new modernized Banner forces were token in nature.

The Empress Dowager and the Guangxu Emperor died within a day of each other in November 1908. Sources indicate that the will of the emperor ordered Yuan's execution. Nonetheless, he avoided death. In January 1909, he was relieved of all his posts by the regent, Prince Chun. The public reason for Yuan's resignation was that he was returning to his home in the village of Huanshang, the prefecture-level city of Anyang, due to a foot disease.

During his three years of effective exile, Yuan kept contact with his close allies, including Duan Qirui, who reported to him regularly about army proceedings. Yuan had arranged for the marriage of his niece (whom he had adopted) to Duan as a means to consolidate power. The loyalty of the Beiyang Army was still undoubtedly behind him. Having this strategic military support, Yuan held the balance of power between various revolutionaries (like Sun Yat-sen) and the Qing court. Both wanted Yuan on their side.

Wuchang Uprising and Republic 

The Wuchang Uprising took place on 10 October 1911 in Hubei province. The southern provinces subsequently declared their independence from the Qing court, but neither the northern provinces nor the Beiyang Army had a clear stance for or against the rebellion. Both the Qing court and Yuan were fully aware that the Beiyang Army was the only Qing force powerful enough to quell the revolutionaries. The court requested Yuan's return on 27 October, but he repeatedly declined offers from the Qing court for his return, first as the Viceroy of Huguang, and then as Prime Minister of the Imperial Cabinet. Time was on Yuan's side, and Yuan waited, using his "foot ailment" as a pretext to his continual refusal.

After further pleas by the Qing Court, Yuan agreed and eventually left his village for Beijing on 30 October, becoming prime minister on 1 November 1911. Immediately after that he asked the regent to withdraw from politics, which forced Zaifeng to resign as regent. This made way for Yuan to form a new, predominantly Han Chinese, cabinet of confidants, with only one Manchu as Minister of Suzerainty. To further reward Yuan's loyalty to the court, the Empress Dowager Longyu offered Yuan the noble title Marquis of the First Rank, an honour only previously given to 19th century General Zeng Guofan for his raising of the Xiang Army to suppress the Taiping Rebellion. Meanwhile, in the Battle of Yangxia, Yuan's forces recaptured Hankou and Hanyang from the revolutionaries. Yuan knew that complete suppression of the revolution would end his usefulness to the Qing regime. Instead of attacking Wuchang, he began to negotiate with the revolutionaries.

Abdication of child emperor 

The revolutionaries had elected Sun Yat-sen as the first Provisional President of the Republic of China, but they were in a weak position militarily, so they negotiated with the Qing, using Yuan as an intermediary. Yuan arranged for the abdication of the child emperor Puyi in return for being granted the position of President of the Republic of China. Puyi recalled in his autobiography the meeting between Longyu and Yuan:

Sun agreed to Yuan's presidency after some internal bickering, but asked that the capital be situated in Nanjing. Yuan, however, wanted the geographic advantage of having the nation's capital close to his base of military power. Many theorized that Cao Kun, one of his trusted subordinate Beiyang military commanders, fabricated a coup d'état in Beijing and Tianjin, apparently under Yuan's orders, to provide an excuse for Yuan not to leave his sphere of influence in Zhili (present-day Hebei province). However, the claim that the coup was organized by Yuan has been challenged by others. The revolutionaries compromised again, and the capital of the new republic was established in Beijing. Yuan Shikai was elected Provisional President of the Republic of China by the Nanjing Provisional Senate on 14 February 1912, and sworn in on 10 March of that year.

Democratic elections 
In February 1913, democratic elections were held for the National Assembly in which the Kuomintang (KMT – "Chinese Nationalist Party") scored a significant victory. Song Jiaoren of the KMT zealously supported a cabinet system and was widely regarded as a candidate for prime minister.

One of Song's main political goals was to ensure that the powers and independence of China's Parliament be properly protected from the influence of the office of the president. Song's goals in curtailing the office of the president conflicted with the interests of Yuan, who, by mid-1912, clearly dominated the provisional cabinet and was showing signs of a desire to hold overwhelming executive power. During Song's travels through China in 1912, he had openly and vehemently expressed the desire to limit the powers of the president in terms that often appeared openly critical of Yuan's ambitions. When the results of the 1913 elections indicated a clear victory for the KMT, it appeared that Song would be in a position to exercise a dominant role in selecting the premier and cabinet, and the party could have proceeded to push for the election of a future president in a parliamentary setting. On 20 March 1913, Song Jiaoren was shot by a lone gunman in Shanghai, and died two days later. The trail of evidence led to the secretary of the cabinet and the provisional premier of Yuan's government. Although Yuan was considered by contemporary Chinese media sources as the man most likely behind the assassination, the main conspirators investigated by authorities were either themselves assassinated or disappeared mysteriously. For lack of evidence, Yuan was not implicated.

Becoming emperor 

Tensions between the KMT and Yuan continued to intensify. After arriving in Peking, the elected Parliament attempted to gain control over Yuan, to develop a permanent constitution, and to hold a legitimate, open presidential election. Because he had authorized $100 million of "reorganization loans" from a variety of foreign banks, the KMT in particular were highly critical of Yuan's handling of the national budget.  Yuan's crackdown on the KMT began in 1913, with the suppression and bribery of KMT members in the two legislative chambers. Anti-Yuan revolutionaries also claimed Yuan orchestrated the collapse of the KMT internally and dismissed governors interpreted as being pro-KMT.

Second revolution 
Seeing the situation for his party worsen, Sun Yat-sen fled to Japan in August 1913, and called for a Second Revolution, this time against Yuan Shikai. Subsequently, Yuan gradually took over the government, using the military as the base of his power. He dissolved the national and provincial assemblies, and the House of Representatives and Senate were replaced by the newly formed "Council of State", with Duan Qirui, his trusted Beiyang lieutenant, as prime minister. He relied on the American-educated Tsai Tingkan for English translation and connections with western powers. Finally, Yuan had himself elected president to a five-year term, publicly labelled the KMT a seditious organization, ordered the KMT's dissolution, and evicted all its members from Parliament. The KMT's "Second Revolution" ended in failure as Yuan's troops achieved complete victory over revolutionary uprisings. Provincial governors with KMT loyalties who remained willingly submitted to Yuan. Because those commanders not loyal to Yuan were effectively removed from power, the Second Revolution cemented Yuan's power.

In January 1914, China's Parliament was formally dissolved. To give his government a semblance of legitimacy, Yuan convened a body of 66 men from his cabinet who, on 1 May 1914, produced a "constitutional compact" that effectively replaced China's provisional constitution. The new legal status quo gave Yuan, as president, practically unlimited powers over China's military, finances, foreign policy, and the rights of China's citizens. Yuan justified these reforms by stating that representative democracy had been proven inefficient by political infighting.

After his victory, Yuan reorganized the provincial governments. Each province was supported by a military governor as well as a civil authority, giving each governor control of their own army. This helped lay the foundations for the warlordism that crippled China over the next two decades.

During Yuan's presidency, a silver "dollar" (yuan in Chinese) carrying his portrait was introduced. This coin type was the first "dollar" coin of the central authorities of the Republic of China to be minted in significant quantities. It became a staple silver coin type during the first half of the 20th century and was struck for the last time as late as the 1950s. They were also extensively forged.

Japan's 21 demands 

In 1914, Japan captured the German colony at Qingdao. In January 1915, Japan sent a secret ultimatum, known as the Twenty-one Demands, to Beijing. Japan demanded an extension of extraterritoriality, the sale of businesses in debt to Japan and the cession of Qingdao to Japan, and virtual control of finance and the local police. When these demands were made public, hostility within China was expressed in nationwide anti-Japanese demonstrations and an effective national boycott of Japanese goods.  With support from Britain and the United States Yuan secured Japan's dropping part five of the demands, which would have given Japan a general control of Chinese affairs. However he did accept the less onerous terms and that led to a decline in the popularity of Yuan's government.

Revival of hereditary monarchy 

To build up his own authority, Yuan began to re-institute elements of state Confucianism. As the main proponent of reviving Qing state religious observances, Yuan effectively participated as emperor in rituals held at the Qing Temple of Heaven. In late 1915, rumors were floated of a popular consensus that the hereditary monarchy should be revived. With his power secure, many of Yuan's supporters, notably monarchist Yang Du, advocated for a revival of the hereditary monarchy, asking Yuan to take on the title of Emperor. Yang reasoned that the Chinese masses had long been used to monarchic rule, the Republic had only been effective as a transitional phase to end Manchu rule, and China's political situation demanded the stability that only a dynastic monarchy could ensure. The American political scientist Frank Johnson Goodnow suggested a similar idea. Negotiators representing Japan had also offered to support Yuan's ambitions as one of the rewards for Yuan's support of the Twenty-One Demands.

On 20 November 1915, Yuan held a specially convened "Representative Assembly" which voted unanimously to offer Yuan the throne. On 12 December 1915, Yuan "accepted" the invitation and proclaimed himself Emperor of the Chinese Empire under the era name of Hongxian (i.e. Constitutional Abundance). The new Empire of China was to formally begin on 1 January 1916, when Yuan, the Hongxian Emperor, intended to conduct the accession rites. Soon after becoming emperor, the Hongxian Emperor placed an order with the former imperial potters for a 40,000-piece porcelain set costing 1.4 million yuan, a large jade seal, and two imperial robes costing 400,000 yuan each.

Public and international reactions to dynastic monarchy's revival 
The Hongxian Emperor expected widespread domestic and international support for his reign. British diplomats and bankers worked hard to help them succeed. They had set up a banking consortium that loaned his government £25 million in April 1913. However, he and his supporters had badly miscalculated. Many of the emperor's closest supporters abandoned him, and the solidarity of the emperor's Beiyang clique of military protégés dissolved. There were open protests throughout China denouncing the Hongxian Emperor. Foreign governments, including Japan, suddenly proved indifferent or openly hostile to him, not giving him the recognition anticipated. Sun Yat-sen, who had fled to Tokyo and set up a base there, organized efforts to overthrow the Hongxian Emperor. The emperor's sons publicly fought over the title of "Crown Prince", and formerly loyal subordinates such as Duan Qirui and Xu Shichang left him to create their own factions.

Abandonment of monarchy and death 

Faced with widespread opposition, the Hongxian Emperor repeatedly delayed the accession rites in order to appease his foes, but his prestige was irreparably damaged and province after province continued to voice disapproval. On 25 December 1915, Yunnan's military governor, Cai E, rebelled, launching the National Protection War. The governor of Guizhou followed in January 1916, and Guangxi declared independence in March. Funding for the Hongxian Emperor's accession ceremony was cut on 1 March.

Yuan formally abandoned the empire on 22 March after being emperor for only 83 days; primarily due to these mounting revolts as well as declining health from uremia. This was not enough for his enemies, who called for his resignation as president, causing more provinces to rebel. Yuan died of uremia at 10 a.m. on 6 June 1916, at the age of fifty-six.

Yuan's remains were moved to his home province and placed in a large mausoleum in Anyang. In 1928, the tomb was looted by Feng Yuxiang and his soldiers during the Northern Expedition.

Yuan had a wife and nine concubines, who bore him 17 sons and 15 daughters, but only three were prominent: Prince Yuan Keding, Prince Yuan Kewen, and Prince Yuan Keliang.

Evaluation and legacy 

Historians in China have considered Yuan's rule mostly negatively. He introduced far-ranging modernizations in law and social areas, and trained and organized one of China's first modern armies; but the loyalty Yuan had fostered in the armed forces dissolved after his death, undermining the authority of the central government. Yuan financed his regime through large foreign loans, and is criticized for weakening Chinese morale and international prestige, and for allowing the Japanese to gain broad concessions over China.

Jonathan Spence, however, notes in his influential survey that Yuan was "ambitious, both for his country and for himself", and that "even as he subverted the constitution, paradoxically he sought to build on late-Qing attempts at reforms and to develop institutions that would bring strong and stable government to China." To gain foreign confidence and end the hated system of extraterritoriality, Yuan strengthened the court system and invited foreign advisers to reform the penal system.

After Yuan's death, there was an effort by Li Yuanhong to revive the Republic by recalling the legislators who had been ejected in 1913, but this effort was confused and ineffective in asserting central control. Li lacked any support from the military. There was a short-lived effort in 1917 to revive the Qing dynasty led by the loyalist general Zhang Xun, but his forces were defeated by rival warlords later that year.

After the collapse of Zhang's movement, all pretense of strength from the central government collapsed, and China descended into a period of warlordism. Over the next several decades, the offices of both the president and parliament became the tools of militarists, and the politicians in Peking became dependent on regional governors for their support and political survival. For this reason, Yuan is sometimes called "the Father of the Warlords". However, it is not accurate to attribute China's subsequent age of warlordism as a personal preference, since in his career as a military reformer he had attempted to forge a modern army based on the Japanese model. Throughout his lifetime, he demonstrated an understanding of staffing, military education, and regular transfers of officer personnel, combining these skills to create China's first modern military organisation. After his return to power in 1911, however, he seemed willing to sacrifice his legacy of military reform for imperial ambitions, and instead ruled by a combination of violence and bribery that destroyed the idealism of the early Republican movement.

In the CCTV Production Towards the Republic, Yuan is portrayed through most of his early years as an able administrator, although a very skilled manipulator of political situations. His self-proclamation as Emperor is largely depicted as being influenced by external forces, especially that of his son, prince Yuan Keding.

A bixi (stone tortoise) with a stele in honor of Yuan Shikai, which was installed in Anyang's Huanyuan Park soon after his death, was (partly) restored in 1993.

Names 
Chinese men before 1949 customarily used and were referred to by various names. Yuan's courtesy name was "Weiting" (Wade-Giles spelling: Wei-ting), and he used the pseudonym "Rong'an" (Wade-Giles spelling: Jung-an). He was sometimes referred to by the name of his birthplace, "Xiangcheng", or by a title for tutors of the crown prince, "Kung-pao".

Awards and honours 
 Order of the Paulownia Flowers (Japan)
 Order of the Red Eagle (Germany)

Family 

 Paternal grandfather
 Yuan Shusan

 Father
 Yuan Baozhong (1823–1874), courtesy name Shouchen

 Uncle
 Yuan Baoqing (1825–1873), courtesy name Duchen, pseudonym Yanzhi, Yuan Baozhong's younger brother

 Wife
 Yu Yishang, daughter of Yu Ao, a wealthy man from Shenqiu County, Henan; married Yuan Shikai in 1876; mother of Yuan Keding.

 Concubines
 Lady Shen, previously a courtesan from Suzhou
 Lady Lee, of Korean origin; mother of Yuan Bozhen, Yuan Kequan, Yuan Keqi, Yuan Kejian, and Yuan Kedu
 Lady Kim, of Korean origin; mother of Yuan Kewen, Yuan Keliang, Yuan Shuzhen, Yuan Huanzhen, and Yuan Sizhen
 Lady O, of Korean origin; mother of Yuan Keduan, Yuan Zhongzhen, Yuan Cizhen, and Yuan Fuzhen
 Lady Yang, mother of Yuan Kehuan, Yuan Kezhen, Yuan Kejiu, Yuan Ke'an, Yuan Jizhen, and Yuan Lingzhen
 Lady Ye, previously a prostitute in Nanjing; mother of Yuan Kejie, Yuan Keyou, Yuan Fuzhen, Yuan Qizhen, and Yuan Ruizhen
 Lady Zhang, originally from Henan
 Lady Guo, originally a prostitute from Suzhou; mother of Yuan Kexiang, Yuan Kehe, and Yuan Huzhen
 Lady Liu, originally a maid to Yuan Shikai's fifth concubine Lady Yang; mother of Yuan Kefan and Yuan Yizhen

 17 sons
 Yuan Keding (1878–1958), courtesy name Yuntai
 Yuan Kewen (1889–1931), courtesy name Baocen
 Yuan Keliang, married a daughter of Zhang Baixi
 Yuan Keduan, married He Shenji (何慎基, daughter of He Zhongjing
 Yuan Kequan (1898–1941), courtesy name Gui'an, pseudonym Baina, married a daughter of Toteke Duanfang
 Yuan Kehuan, married Chen Zheng (陳徵, daughter of Chen Qitai)
 Yuan Keqi, married a daughter of Sun Baoqi
 Yuan Kezhen, married Zhou Ruizhu (周瑞珠, daughter of Zhou Fu
 Yuan Kejiu, married Li Shaofang (黎紹芳, 1906–1945, second daughter of Li Yuanhong) in 1934
 Yuan Kejian, married a daughter of Lu Jianzhang
 Yuan Ke'an, married Li Baohui (daughter of Li Shiming
 Yuan Kedu, married a daughter of the wealthy Luo Yunzhang
 Yuan Kexiang, married firstly Zhang Shoufang (張壽芳, granddaughter of Na Tong, married secondly Chen Sixing (陳思行, daughter of Chen Bingkun)
 Yuan Kejie, married Lady Wang
 Yuan Kehe, married a daughter of Zhang Diaochen
 Yuan Kefan, died young
 Yuan Keyou, married a daughter of Yu Yunpeng

 15 daughters

 Famous grandsons and great-grandsons
 Yuan's grandson, Luke Chia-Liu Yuan (1912–2003) was a Chinese-American physicist and husband of famed physicist Chien-Shiung Wu.
 Yuan's great-grandson, Li-Young Lee (1957–), is an Indonesian-born Chinese-American writer and poet.

See also 

 Beiyang Army
 History of the Republic of China
 Republic of China Armed Forces
 Sino-German cooperation (1926–1941)

Notes

References

Citations

Sources 

 Barnouin, Barbara and Yu Changgen. Zhou Enlai: A Political Life. Hong Kong: Chinese University of Hong Kong, 2006. p. 14 retrieved 12 March 2011
 Bonavia, David. China's Warlords. New York: Oxford University Press. 1995. 
  online free to borrow
  Shan, Patrick Fuliang (2018). Yuan Shikai: A Reappraisal (U of British Columbia Press. )
 
 Zhang, Hong. "Yuan Shikai and the Significance of his Troop Training at Xiaozhan, Tianjin, 1895–1899." Chinese Historical Review 26.1 (2019): 37–54

Further reading 
 Clubb, O. Edmund. 20th century China (1965) online pp. 40–60.
 Koji, Hirata. "Britain's Men on the Spot in China: John Jordan, Yuan Shikai, and the Reorganization Loan, 1912–1914." Modern Asian Studies 47.3 (2013): 895–934.
 Lowe, Peter. "Great Britain, Japan and the Fall of Yuan Shih-K'ai, 1915-1916" Historical Journal 13#4 (1970), pp. 706–20 online
 
 Palmer. Norman D. "Makers of Modern China: II. The Strong Man: Yuan Shih-kai" Current History   (Sep 1948): 15#85 pp. 149–55. in Proquest.
 Putnam Weale, B. L. The Fight For The Republic In China (1917) online
 Rankin, Mary Backus. "State and society in early republican politics, 1912–18." China Quarterly 150 (1997): 260–81. online
 Yim, Kwanha. "Yüan Shih-k'ai and the Japanese." Journal of Asian Studies 24.1 (1964): 63–73 online.
 
 Zhang, Hong. "Yuan Shikai and the Significance of his Troop Training at Xiaozhan, Tianjin, 1895–1899." Chinese Historical Review 26.1 (2019): 37–54.

External links 

 Early support for Yuan among overseas Chinese
  This etext first published in 1917 contains a detailed account of Yuan Shikai, his rise and fall.
 Map of Yuan's mausoleum.
 

|-

|-

|-

|-

|-

|-

|-

|-

|-

Chinese emperors
Presidents of the Republic of China
20th-century Chinese monarchs
Monarchs who abdicated
Grand Councillors of the Qing dynasty
Qing dynasty chancellors
Qing dynasty generals
Qing dynasty politicians from Henan
Chinese people of the Boxer Rebellion
People of the 1911 Revolution
Politicians from Zhoukou
Republic of China warlords from Henan
1859 births
1916 deaths
20th-century Chinese heads of government
1910s in China
Presidents for life
Qing dynasty writers
Chinese military writers
Writers from Zhoukou
Marshals of China
Viceroys of Huguang
Viceroys of Zhili
Huai Army personnel
Empire of China (1915–1916)
Foreign Ministers of the Qing dynasty
Self-proclaimed monarchy
Deaths from uremia
Founding monarchs
Recipients of the Order of the Rising Sun with Paulownia Flowers
Chinese reformers
Chinese military personnel of the First Sino-Japanese War